Stop Your Motor is the Association's sixth studio album (not including their greatest-hits album or the Goodbye, Columbus soundtrack) and their final project for Warner Bros. It marked the debut of keyboardist Richard Thompson, replacing original member Russ Giguere. The songs "That's Racin (original titled "I'm Going To Be A Racin' Star") and "The First Sound" were initially slated to be part of a proposed soundtrack for a documentary film about auto racing, Once Upon a Wheel, hosted by Paul Newman but the soundtrack failed to materialise beyond a promotional level (sponsored by Coca-Cola). The title song from the documentary, as composed by Terry Kirkman, never saw an official release.

The album contained no charting singles and peaked at number 158 on Billboard.

Track listing

References

1971 albums
The Association albums
Warner Records albums